Francisco Parra Duperón (1827–1899) born in Mayagüez, Puerto Rico, was a lawyer and banker.  He became a lawyer at a young age and moved from Mayagüez to Ponce, Puerto Rico where he established his law practice. He was also one of the founders of the Banco Crédito y Ahorro Ponceño, and he was the bank's first president from 1895 until 1896. Teatro La Perla, was built in May 1864 under his initiative and that of Pedro Garriga.

Legacy
The city of Ponce honored him by naming Puerto Rico Highway 133 "Francisco Parra Duperon Street" in his honor. There is also a school in Barrio Canas named in his honor.

Personal life
Parra Duperon married Eufemia Capó Ortiz de la Renta Bermudas and they had two children, Pedro Juan Parra Capó and Francisco Parra Capó. Pedro Juan became captain of the Seventh Brigade of the Ponce Municipal Fire Corps in 1899, while Francisco became mayor of the city of Ponce.

See also

 Ponce, Puerto Rico
 List of Puerto Ricans

References

Attorneys from Ponce
People from Mayagüez, Puerto Rico
Parra
Puerto Rican businesspeople
1827 births
1899 deaths
Burials at Panteón Nacional Román Baldorioty de Castro
19th-century American businesspeople